The statue of Andrés Manuel López Obrador was a limestone sculpture of the 65th president of Mexico, Andrés Manuel López Obrador. It was installed at the intersection of Isidro Fabela Avenue and Circuito José Jiménez Cantú, in Atlacomulco, a municipality of the State of Mexico. It was placed on 29 December 2021 by Roberto Téllez Monroy, the outgoing mayor. Téllez Monroy is a member of the National Regeneration Movement (MORENA) political party, which was founded by López Obrador.

The statue was toppled and destroyed during the early morning of the change of municipal administration by unidentified people on 1 January 2022 (New Year's Day). Téllez Monroy would file a complaint for vandalism.

History, installation and destruction
Roberto Téllez Monroy served as the mayor of Atlacomulco, State of Mexico, from 1 January 2018 to 31 December 2021. He was elected to govern as a represent of the National Regeneration Movement (MORENA) political party, which was created by Andrés Manuel López Obrador (commonly abbreviated as AMLO), the president of Mexico since 2018. On 29 December 2021, Téllez Monroy installed a statue to honor López Obrador. He said that he paid $50,000 Mexican pesos (US$2,400) for the statue with his own money and not with public money. The cost of the sculpture was billed to the municipal treasury so that it would remain as municipal patrimony. He installed it because he wanted to "break stigmas and paradigms and for people to recognize what has been done. It is a recognition to the President of the Republic". Téllez Monroy became the first politician not associated with the Institutional Revolutionary Party (PRI) to govern the municipality. Atlacomulco is associated with the alleged political group of the same name, from which several governors have emerged, all of whom were born or raised in the municipality. Behind the sculpture, a bust of Emiliano Zapata was also placed to complement the statue of López Obrador. In addition, a phrase said by Zapata was placed: "Whoever wants to be an eagle should fly, whoever wants to be a worm should crawl, but should not scream when they get stepped on".

During the early hours of 1 January (New Year's Day) and during the change of Téllez Moreno's administration to that of his successor, Marisol Arias Flores, representative of the opposition coalition Va por México (in which the PRI is an ally), the statue was toppled and destroyed by unidentified people. The head and legs were reported as missing.

According to a statement by Téllez Monroy, neighbors reported that around the time of the collapse the street lights at the site were turned off. He also reported that the security camera recording the statue was not working. He filed a complaint with the state prosecutor's office for vandalism. As of April 2022, the remains of the statue were still being guarded by local security because they had not been claimed. In addition, the complaint filed was stalled.

Description
The concrete pedestal includes a plaque that reads in all caps:

It was sculpted by citizens of Tlalpujahua, Michoacán.

Reception
Former president of Mexico, Felipe Calderón, said that the installation exemplifies the meaning of "Fourth Transformation", López Obrador's political platform, referring to the PRI's previous phases: the National Revolutionary Party, the Party of the Mexican Revolution, and the PRI era, being MORENA its "Fourth Transformation", adding that "Each stage has had the living statue of its maximum leader. And moreover... in Atlacomulco".

After its demolition, around 20 people protested in front of the municipal palace. Diego Fernández de Cevallos said that López Obrador destroyed it himself because he promised to not leave a stone set upon another.

López Obrador on monuments
On 2 October 2019 and on 10 September 2020, López Obrador commented that he did not want streets and neighborhoods with his name, nor did he want statues and monuments with his figure, since it was no longer a time for personality cults. On 3 January 2022, he welcomed the statue but reiterated his position on monuments.

Notes

References

2021 establishments in Mexico
2021 sculptures
2022 disestablishments in Mexico
Destroyed sculptures
Limestone sculptures
Monuments and memorials in Mexico
Outdoor sculptures in the State of Mexico
Sculptures of men in Mexico
Statues in Mexico
Statues of presidents
Vandalized works of art in Mexico